Ohio Township is an inactive township in Mississippi County, in the U.S. state of Missouri.

Ohio Township was established in 1847, taking its name from the nearby Ohio River.

References

Townships in Missouri
Townships in Mississippi County, Missouri